Ursula Evje (born 13 December 1944 in Oslo) is a Norwegian politician for the Progress Party.

She was elected to the Norwegian Parliament from Akershus in 1997, and was re-elected on two occasions. However, in December 2004, during her third term, she left the party, continuing as an independent representative. She did not seek re-election for a new party in 2005.

Evje was a member of the executive committee of Skedsmo municipality council from 1995 to 1998.

References

1944 births
Living people
Progress Party (Norway) politicians
Members of the Storting
Akershus politicians
Politicians from Oslo
Women members of the Storting
21st-century Norwegian politicians
21st-century Norwegian women politicians
20th-century Norwegian politicians
20th-century Norwegian women politicians